Circumpolar may refer to:
 Antarctic region
 Antarctic Circle
 the Antarctic Circumpolar Current
 Subantarctic
 List of Antarctic and subantarctic islands
 Antarctic Convergence
 Antarctic Circumpolar Wave
 Antarctic Ocean
 Arctic region
 Arctic Circle
 Subarctic
 Circumpolar peoples
 Arctic Cooperation and Politics
 Arctic Ocean
 List of islands in the Arctic Ocean
 Circumpolar constellation, a constellation that never rises or sets from the perspective of a given latitude on Earth
 Circumpolar star, a star that never rises or sets from the perspective of a given latitude on Earth
 Polar front in meteorology
 circumpolar navigation, a global circumnavigation which traverses both poles

See also
 Circumpolar distribution
Antipodes